Adarna is a Philippine television drama fantasy series broadcast by GMA Network. The series is loosely based on the Philippine epic Ibong Adarna. Directed by Ricky Davao, it stars Kylie Padilla in the title role. It premiered on November 18, 2013 on the network's Telebabad line up replacing Kahit Nasaan Ka Man. The series concluded on March 7, 2014 with a total of 80 episodes. It was replaced by Kambal Sirena in its timeslot.

The series is streaming online on YouTube.

Premise
Ada is prophesied to be the most powerful healer in Pugad Sanghaya. As she discovers the path towards fulfilling her fate, she meets three men - Migo, Bok and Falco.

Cast and characters

Lead cast
 Kylie Padilla as Ada / Angel

Supporting cast
 Geoff Eigenmann as Migo "Miggy" Salva
 Benjamin Alves as Bok / Agalon
 Mikael Daez as Falco
 Jean Garcia as Larka / Lupe
 Michelle Madrigal as Garuda
 Ryza Cenon as Mikay
 Chynna Ortaleza as Janelle
 Saab Magalona as Robin Abrientos
 Maureen Larrazabal as Jinky
 Jestoni Alarcon as Simon
 Dante Rivero as Uwakro

Guest cast
 Neil Ryan Sese as Kestrel
 Anica Tindoy as young Ada
 Josh Clement Eugenio as young Miggy
 Frances Makil-Ignacio as Teray
 Kris Bernal as Berbola 
 Solenn Heussaff as Daiana
 Katrina Halili as Theresa
 Isay Alvarez as Annaliza Salva
 Arkin Magalona as Mikel 
 Patricia Ysmael as Wendy
 Marc Acueza as Leon
 Mike "Pekto" Nacua as Hugho
 Timmy Cruz as Calisay
 Dianne Hernandez as Maya
 Carme Sanchez as Ima Pepita
 Angie Ferro as Uraculo
 JC Tiuseco as Heron
 Daniella Amable as Migo's niece
 Miko Zarasadias as Migo's nephew
 Buboy Villar as Jerry
 RJ Padilla as Rocco
 Roldan Aquino as Gregorio Abrientos
 Diva Montelaba as Raya

Ratings
According to AGB Nielsen Philippines' Mega Manila household television ratings, the pilot episode of Adarna earned an 18.5% rating. While the final episode scored a 20.8% rating.

References

External links
 
 

Ibong Adarna
2013 Philippine television series debuts
2014 Philippine television series endings
Fantaserye and telefantasya
Filipino-language television shows
GMA Network drama series
Television shows set in the Philippines